Madman or Mad Man may refer to:

Film and television
 The Madman (film), a 1911 silent film
 Madman (film), a 1982 horror film
 Madman Entertainment, an Australian media distributor

In print
 The Madman, an essay in Friedrich Nietzsche's The Gay Science
 The Madman (book), a book by Kahlil Gibran
 The Mad Man, a novel by Samuel R. Delany
 Madman (Marvel Comics), a Hulk villain
 Madman (Mike Allred character), a superhero created by Mike Allred

Songs
 "Mad Man" (song), a song by Haste the Day
 "Madman" (song), an unfinished 1969 song by John Lennon
 "Madman" (Cuddly Toys song), 1979
 "Mad Man", a song by the Hives from A.K.A. I-D-I-O-T
 "Madman", a song by Silverchair from Frogstomp

People
 Ray Hedges, record producer
 Madman Muntz (1914–1987), American businessman and television pitchman
 Madman (rapper), stage name of Italian rapper Pierfrancesco Botrugno (born 1988)
 Madman Fulton, a ring name of American professional wrestler Jacob Southwick (born 1990)
 Mad Man Pondo, a ring name of American professional wrestler Kevin Canady (born 1969)

See also
 Charles XII of Sweden, nicknamed "Madman of the North"
 Donald II of Scotland, nicknamed Dásachtach ("the Madman")
 Giampaolo Pazzini (born 1984), Italian footballer nicknamed Il Pazzo ("the Madman")
 Madman theory, a foreign policy concept used by U.S. President Richard Nixon
 Mad Men, an American TV show
 Madmen, a DC Comics supervillain group